Ma Sein was a Hanthawaddy commander who occupied Toungoo (Taungoo) for three months in 1375−76. The ethnic Mon commander was posted in Toungoo by King Binnya U of Hanthawaddy upon request of Viceroy Pyanchi I of Toungoo in order to raise a rebellion against Ava. His army was in charge of Toungoo in 1375 when Pyanchi I was assassinated near Prome (Pyay) by pro-Ava forces. The commander claimed the state of Toungoo on behalf of Hanthawaddy, and resisted the subsequent siege by Pyanchi I's son Pyanchi II and son-in-law Sokkate for three months. He was put to death when the siege was broken three months later.

References

Notes

Bibliography
 
 
 
 

Ava dynasty
Hanthawaddy dynasty
1376 deaths